"Sittin' in the Balcony" is a song written and performed by John D. Loudermilk under his artist name Johnny Dee. It was released in January 1957 on the Colonial Records label. Eddie Cochran had a Top 40 hit in the U.S. with his recording on Liberty Records in 1957.

Eddie Cochran version

"Sittin' in the Balcony" is a song performed by Eddie Cochran and released on single by Liberty Records in January 1957. It rose to number 18 on the Billboard charts.

Chart performance

Other notable versions
 Don McLean (1989)
 Keld Heick (2010)

References

External links
 Eddie Cochran US discography
 Rate Your Music review Sittin' in the Balcony / Dark Lonely Street
 Sittin' in the Balcony on Second Hand Songs

1957 singles
John D. Loudermilk songs
Eddie Cochran songs
Liberty Records singles
Songs written by John D. Loudermilk